Club de Fútbol Ocelotes de la Universidad Autónoma de Chiapas, was a Mexican football club that played in the Liga Premier – Serie B. The club was founded in 2002 when there were no professional football clubs in the state of Chiapas. The club played in the town of San Cristóbal de las Casas, Chiapas where they represent the Universidad Autónoma de Chiapas. On June 8, 2015, the team was relocated from Tapachula, Chiapas due a new team in the Ascenso MX.

In June 2019, the directive reached an agreement with Cafetaleros de Chiapas, with this deal Ocelotes UNACH dissolved and became a new team based in Tapachula but being administered and affiliated with the squad of the capital. The new team was placed in Serie A and had the right to promote Ascenso MX.

Current roster

References

 SEGUNDA DIVISION

 
Football clubs in Chiapas
Association football clubs established in 2002
2002 establishments in Mexico
San Cristóbal de las Casas
Liga Premier de México